is an autobahn in southwestern Germany. The newest section, between Neustadt and Landau, was opened only in the early 1990s.

Plans to build a final stretch between Kandel or Wörth am Rhein and the French A35 autoroute towards Haguenau and Strasbourg were not implemented during the 1990s when the focus of Autobahn construction switched to the eastern side of the country: the project remains contentious because of the ecological impact it could have on the Bienwald (wooded area) through which the road would run.

Exit list 

 {Planned)
|-
|colspan="3"|

| 
|}

External links 

65
A065
Anterior Palatinate
Südliche Weinstraße